The play-offs of the 2014 Fed Cup Asia/Oceania Zone Group II were the final stages of the Group II Zonal Competition involving teams from Asia and Oceania. Using the positions determined in their pools, the thirteen teams faced off to determine their placing in the 2014 Fed Cup Asia/Oceania Zone Group II. The top team advanced to Asia/Oceania Group I in 2015.

Pool results

1st to 4th play-offs 
The first placed teams of the pools were drawn in head-to-head rounds.

Hong Kong vs. India

Philippines vs. Turkmenistan

Promotion play-off 
The winners of the 1st to 4th play-offs then played against each other for promotion. The winner advances to the Asia/Oceania Group I in 2015.

Hong Kong vs. Philippines

5th to 8th play-offs
The second placed teams of the pools were drawn in head-to-head rounds to find the fifth to eighth placed teams.

Malaysia vs. New Zealand

Singapore vs. Kyrgyzstan

9th to 12th play-offs 
The third placed teams of the two pools were drawn in head-to-head rounds to find the 9th to 12th placed teams.

Vietnam vs. Iran

Sri Lanka vs. Iraq

Final placements 

  advanced to Asia/Oceania Zone Group I in 2015.

See also 
 Fed Cup structure

References

External links 
 Fed Cup website

P2